Boothbay Region High School (Boothbay or BRHS) is a public high school in Boothbay Harbor, Maine, serving the towns of Boothbay and Boothbay Harbor. The school is open to students from neighboring towns, primarily Edgecomb and Southport. Formed in 1874 and originally called Boothbay Harbor High School, it was renamed after its relocation, when it became the local high school for the other neighboring towns of the Boothbay Region. The current high school building was constructed in 1956. However, there are currently plans in development to demolish the building in order to expand and rebuild it.

History 
In 1874 there was a union of two districts in Boothbay and the following year a high school was built. There were three rooms and the grades were: primary, intermediate, and grammar. The building was first used for the winter terms after being dedicated with appropriate ceremonies. The grammar school was taught by L. F. Coburn, Brunswick, the intermediate by Miss P. H. Burr, Mercer, and the Primary by Miss Georgia E. Hodgdon, Boothbay, now Mrs. W. R. Holton.

The grade school building at Boothbay Center was built in 1877, the grades being grammar and primary. As in the other cases the first schools were taught in the winter following erection. The grammar school was taught by Miss Annie Adams, Boothbay, now Mrs. Woodbridge Reed, and the primary by Miss M. Ella Baker, Boothbay, now Mrs. Charles E. Sherman.

Two terms of school, with an average length of ten weeks, were taught. Average wages per week in summer were $4.70; average wages per month in winter were $36.70; and the total school fund in 1880 was $4959.73. The first public graduation exercises held in either town were in 1893 by the graduating class from the Boothbay Harbor High School. They were arranged by F. B. Greene during his first year as superintendent and Edgar L. Simpson, the principal at the time. In 1893, the grades in the village schools was systematically established, allotting for each room the work for two years in each grade before the high school, and this included a regular college preparatory course. The course of study was printed, framed and hung in each room throughout the school. Since that date (1893) public graduations have regularly occurred and the course, from primary up, has been maintained with few variations from the form then established. In later years, The Grand March became a Boothbay Region tradition, the first one being held in 1911 at the Pythian Opera House.

Academics 
Boothbay offers over 75 courses, and 6 advanced placement (AP) courses. In 2018, 85% of students taking AP exams scored a 3 or higher. Graduating students have had a college acceptance rate averaging 84% over the past three years. The Class of 2021 had a 100% graduation rate. The school has dual enrollment agreements with both the University of Southern Maine and the University of Maine at Fort Kent. In 2015, U.S. News & World Report reported BRHS as among the nation's best public schools.

BRHS has STEM offerings in Engineering, Advanced Robotics, Making and Marketing, Meteorology, and Marine Science. Humanities classes include Arts, Music, Social Sciences, Foreign Languages, and English Language Arts , as well as elective course opportunities for classes such as Recent History and Literature, Sculpture, AP Psychology, Financial Literacy, Power of Film, and Religions of Man.

The school has extra curricular activities including a Math Team, Performing Arts, Student Council, the Student Health Advisory Board, Robotics, and a Pep Band. The Robotics Team were 2018 State runner-ups, and the Math Team placed first in both 2021 and 2022 for the Southern Maine Small Schools category.

Athletics 

Boothbay has various varsity sports teams, including Baseball, Basketball, Cheerleading, Cross country, Field hockey, Football, Lacrosse, Sailing, Soccer, Swimming, Track and field, and Tennis.

BRHS is a member of the Mountain Valley Conference and has won several State Championships.
 Boys' Basketball - (Class C) 2001
Girls' Basketball - (Class C) 1984, 2019
 Boys' Cross Country - (Class C) 2009, 2013
 Football - (Class D) 1958, 1973, 1975, (Class C) 2001, 2002, (Class E) 2017
 Girls' Outdoor Track & Field - (Class C) 1988, 1990

Notable alumni 
 Mabel Conkling, sculptor
 Matthew Forgues, racewalker
 Tim Sample, humorist

References 

Schools in Lincoln County, Maine
1874 establishments in Maine
High schools in Maine
Buildings and structures in Lincoln County, Maine